Chang & Eng is a book by American author Darin Strauss, published in 2000. It was a nominee for multiple awards, including the Pen Hemingway, the Barnes & Noble Discover Award, the New York Public Library's Literary Lions Award, and a winner of the American Library Association's Alex Award.

Summary
Strauss fictionalizes the lives of Chang and Eng Bunker, the first famous conjoined twins, as they travel from old Siam (Thailand) and find fame in New York and, eventually, the Civil War South.

Plot
In 1811 Chang and Eng Bunker are born, twins joined at the chest by a seven-inch-long ligament, in old Siam (Thailand). (This ligament contains a part of their stomach, the only organ they share.) Besides this connecting band, each twin is completely separate from the other: each has a separate personality, separate desires, is a separate individual. Eng, the more shy and bookish twin, narrates their story. When the book opens, Chang & Eng face their last night—Eng awakens, sees that Chang is dead, and knows that he will die tonight, too. Then the book jumps back in time: to their birth: on their parents' houseboat on the Mekong River. Their mother does not tell them they are different, and they assume that all babies are attached.

Soon, the King of Siam condemns them to death—as a double-omen—but he changes his mind upon seeing what a glorious sight they are. He exploits them as freaks. In 1825, an amoral American promoter brings them to America, and this begins their life of celebrity.

The brothers become the world's most famous circus act, get caught up in the Civil War, marry sisters, and father over 20 children.

Eng—a bookish reader of Shakespeare—becomes a leader (or a tool) of the temperance movement and, from birth to death, wishes desperately to be separated. Chang is charming, a heavy drinker, and he is married to the woman that Eng—in secret—loves, too.

Reception
Chang & Eng was a commercial and critical success, here and abroad, reaching a number of US national bestseller lists (rising as high as #3 on the New York Post's List). Writing in The Guardian, writer and critic Frank Delaney said: "This is an assured and sweeping book...The novel grows and grows in stature. Never less than poignant, it becomes almost unbearably moving." In The New York Times, critic Michiko Kakutani called it "A spirited and promising debut." Writer Andrew Santella, in The New York Times Book Review, found the novel "a story of heroic longing." He continued, "Strauss's novel—its humor, its humanity, its aching sadness—makes for a fine memorial." The Wall Street Journal, called the novel "Bold… Imaginative… A daring story from a brave new voice in literature."  And, in The New Yorker, the book was called "as lyrical as it is daring."

Chang & Eng made a number of year-end best lists, in such venues as Entertainment Weekly, Newsweek, The New York Times Book Review and Los Angeles Times Book Review, as well as in United Kingdom papers The Times and Daily Mail.

The rights to the novel were optioned to Disney, for the director Julie Taymor; the actor Gary Oldman purchased the rights from Disney. Strauss and Oldman together wrote a script to adapt Chang & Eng for the screen.

Awards
Chang & Eng received the 2001 American Library Association Alex Award for fiction, and was a finalist for a number of other awards, including the Barnes & Noble Discover Award and the New York Public Library's Literary Lions Award.

References

External links
 Chang & Eng in The Wall Street Journal
 Chang & Eng in The New York Times Book Review
 A conversation with Darin Strauss in Newsweek 
 Chang & Eng discussed by The Historical Novel Society

2000 American novels
E. P. Dutton books